The 2014 Superclásico de las Américas – Copa Doctor Nicolás Leoz was the 3rd edition of the Superclásico de las Américas. The match was played at Beijing National Stadium in Beijing, China. This was the first time the competition had taken place on foreign soil. It was also the time players outside the two countries' domestic competitions were allowed to participate as opposed to the original formant of only South America-based players being eligible to compete.

Brazil won 2–0 with both goals scored by Diego Tardelli, while Argentina's Lionel Messi had a penalty saved by goalkeeper Jefferson.

Venue

Match details 

|style="vertical-align:top; width:50%"|

|}

References

2014
2014B
2014B
2015
2014 in Chinese football
2014 in Argentine football
2014 in Brazilian football
October 2014 sports events in China